Forstfeld is a commune in the Bas-Rhin department in Grand Est in north-eastern France.

Between 1975 and 2019 the registered population increased from 456 to 754.

Twin towns
  Condat-sur-Vienne

See also
 Communes of the Bas-Rhin department

References

Communes of Bas-Rhin